In Greek mythology, Xanthus or Xanthos (/ˈzænθəs/; Ancient Greek: Ξάνθος means "yellow" or "fair hair") was an Argive prince who later on became king of Pelasgia (i.e. Lesbos).

Family 
Xanthus was the son of Pelasgians king, Triopas of Argos, and Oreasis (Oreaside). His brother was called Inachus (=?Iasus).

Mythology 
Xanthus colonized a piece of Lycian land, making it his residence in there and became the ruler of the Pelasgians who had accompanied him. Later on, Xanthus crossed over to Lesbos, which was uninhabited, and divided the land among the settlers. He named the island, which had formerly been called Issa, Pelasgia after the people who had settled it. 

Seven generations later after the flood of Deucalion had taken place and much of mankind had perished, it came to pass that Lesbos was also laid desolate by the deluge of waters. And after these events Macareus, son of Crinacus, came to the island, and recognizing the beauty of the land, he made his home in it.

Notes

References 

 Diodorus Siculus, The Library of History translated by Charles Henry Oldfather. Twelve volumes. Loeb Classical Library. Cambridge, Massachusetts: Harvard University Press; London: William Heinemann, Ltd. 1989. Vol. 3. Books 4.59–8. Online version at Bill Thayer's Web Site
 Diodorus Siculus, Bibliotheca Historica. Vol 1-2. Immanel Bekker. Ludwig Dindorf. Friedrich Vogel. in aedibus B. G. Teubneri. Leipzig. 1888-1890. Greek text available at the Perseus Digital Library.
 Gaius Julius Hyginus, Fabulae from The Myths of Hyginus translated and edited by Mary Grant. University of Kansas Publications in Humanistic Studies. Online version at the Topos Text Project.

Inachids
Princes in Greek mythology
Kings in Greek mythology
Argive characters in Greek mythology
Mythology of Argos